The Braille pattern dots-2 is a 6-dot braille cell with the middle-left dot raised, or an 8-dot braille cell with its mid-high left dot raised. It is represented by the Unicode code point U+2802, and in Braille ASCII with the number "1".

Unified Braille

In unified international braille, the braille pattern dots-2 is used to represent a comma or other non-letter symbol or semi-letter.

Table of unified braille values

Other braille

Plus dots 7 and 8

Related to Braille pattern dots-2 are Braille patterns 27, 28, and 278, which are used in 8-dot braille systems, such as Gardner-Salinas and Luxembourgish Braille.

Related 8-dot kantenji patterns

In the Japanese kantenji braille, the standard 8-dot Braille patterns 3, 13, 34, and 134 are the patterns related to Braille pattern dots-2, since the two additional dots of kantenji patterns 02, 27, and 027 are placed above the base 6-dot cell, instead of below, as in standard 8-dot braille.

Kantenji using braille patterns 3, 13, 34, or 134

This listing includes kantenji using Braille pattern dots-2 for all 6349 kanji found in JIS C 6226-1978.

  - N/A - used only as a selector

Selector 2

  -  い/糹/#2 + selector 2  =  丼
  -  龸 + selector 2  =  光
  -  る/忄 + 龸 + selector 2  =  恍
  -  日 + 龸 + selector 2  =  晃
  -  に/氵 + 龸 + selector 2  =  洸
  -  氷/氵 + 龸 + selector 2  =  滉
  -  い/糹/#2 + 龸 + selector 2  =  絖
  -  ⺼ + 龸 + selector 2  =  胱
  -  も/門 + selector 2  =  包
  -  も/門 + selector 2 + selector 2  =  勹
  -  け/犬 + も/門 + selector 2  =  匏
  -  れ/口 + も/門 + selector 2  =  咆
  -  つ/土 + も/門 + selector 2  =  垉
  -  よ/广 + も/門 + selector 2  =  庖
  -  き/木 + も/門 + selector 2  =  枹
  -  火 + も/門 + selector 2  =  炮
  -  や/疒 + も/門 + selector 2  =  疱
  -  ひ/辶 + も/門 + selector 2  =  皰
  -  く/艹 + も/門 + selector 2  =  苞
  -  む/車 + も/門 + selector 2  =  蚫
  -  ね/示 + も/門 + selector 2  =  袍
  -  か/金 + も/門 + selector 2  =  鉋
  -  め/目 + も/門 + selector 2  =  靤
  -  と/戸 + も/門 + selector 2  =  鞄
  -  せ/食 + も/門 + selector 2  =  鮑
  -  す/発 + も/門 + selector 2  =  麭
  -  へ/⺩ + selector 2  =  将
  -  へ/⺩ + selector 2 + selector 2  =  爿
  -  へ/⺩ + へ/⺩ + selector 2  =  將
  -  に/氵 + へ/⺩ + selector 2  =  漿
  -  心 + へ/⺩ + selector 2  =  蒋
  -  せ/食 + へ/⺩ + selector 2  =  醤
  -  か/金 + へ/⺩ + selector 2  =  鏘
  -  囗 + selector 2  =  式
  -  む/車 + 囗 + selector 2  =  軾
  -  selector 2 + 囗  =  戎
  -  は/辶 + selector 2  =  支
  -  み/耳 + は/辶 + selector 2  =  跂
  -  は/辶 + む/車 + selector 2  =  翅
  -  ほ/方 + selector 2  =  死
  -  ほ/方 + selector 2 + selector 2  =  歹
  -  氷/氵 + ほ/方 + selector 2  =  斃
  -  く/艹 + ほ/方 + selector 2  =  薨
  -  氷/氵 + selector 2  =  汰
  -  や/疒 + selector 2  =  矢
  -  ち/竹 + や/疒 + selector 2  =  笶
  -  く/艹 + や/疒 + selector 2  =  薙
  -  す/発 + selector 2  =  罪
  -  す/発 + selector 2 + selector 2  =  网
  -  そ/馬 + selector 2  =  羊
  -  な/亻 + そ/馬 + selector 2  =  佯
  -  む/車 + そ/馬 + selector 2  =  恙
  -  囗 + そ/馬 + selector 2  =  觧
  -  そ/馬 + む/車 + selector 2  =  翔
  -  む/車 + selector 2  =  羽
  -  ぬ/力 + む/車 + selector 2  =  勠
  -  よ/广 + む/車 + selector 2  =  廖
  -  て/扌 + む/車 + selector 2  =  挧
  -  き/木 + む/車 + selector 2  =  榻
  -  い/糹/#2 + む/車 + selector 2  =  繆
  -  ま/石 + む/車 + selector 2  =  翊
  -  り/分 + む/車 + selector 2  =  翕
  -  火 + む/車 + selector 2  =  翡
  -  へ/⺩ + む/車 + selector 2  =  翩
  -  も/門 + む/車 + selector 2  =  翳
  -  つ/土 + む/車 + selector 2  =  翹
  -  心 + む/車 + selector 2  =  蓼
  -  え/訁 + む/車 + selector 2  =  謬
  -  せ/食 + む/車 + selector 2  =  醪
  -  か/金 + む/車 + selector 2  =  鏐
  -  と/戸 + selector 2  =  老
  -  れ/口 + と/戸 + selector 2  =  咾
  -  心 + と/戸 + selector 2  =  蓍
  -  む/車 + と/戸 + selector 2  =  蛯
  -  selector 2 + と/戸  =  卜
  -  ⺼ + selector 2  =  臍
  -  心 + selector 2  =  菊
  -  て/扌 + 心 + selector 2  =  掬
  -  心 + 心 + selector 2  =  椈
  -  と/戸 + 心 + selector 2  =  鞠
  -  み/耳 + selector 2  =  足
  -  て/扌 + み/耳 + selector 2  =  捉
  -  う/宀/#3 + み/耳 + selector 2  =  蹇
  -  ん/止 + み/耳 + selector 2  =  齪
  -  せ/食 + selector 2  =  魚
  -  ろ/十 + selector 2  =  鹵
  -  selector 2 + の/禾  =  乏
  -  に/氵 + selector 2 + の/禾  =  泛
  -  を/貝 + selector 2 + の/禾  =  貶
  -  selector 2 + ひ/辶  =  匕
  -  selector 2 + さ/阝  =  卵
  -  う/宀/#3 + selector 2 + さ/阝  =  孵
  -  selector 2 + む/車  =  厶
  -  selector 2 + け/犬  =  太
  -  selector 2 + う/宀/#3  =  孚
  -  き/木 + selector 2 + う/宀/#3  =  桴
  -  selector 2 + き/木  =  巳
  -  火 + selector 2 + き/木  =  煕
  -  selector 2 + ゆ/彳  =  罔
  -  selector 2 + そ/馬  =  遂
  -  火 + selector 2 + そ/馬  =  燧
  -  さ/阝 + selector 2 + そ/馬  =  隧
  -  ち/竹 + selector 2 + む/車  =  簒
  -  selector 2 + 宿 + 宿  =  丿
  -  に/氵 + ん/止 + selector 2  =  滷
  -  selector 2 + い/糹/#2  =  韋

Notes

Braille patterns